The Spanish ironclad Arapiles was a wooden-hulled armored frigate bought from England during the 1860s for the Spanish Navy. Begun as an unarmored steam frigate, she was converted into an ironclad while under construction. Damaged when she ran aground in early 1873, she was under repair in the United States during the Virginius Affair later that year as tensions rose between the US and Spain over the incident. The ship was hulked in 1879 and the poor condition of her hull forced her reconstruction to be cancelled in 1882. Arapiles was scrapped a year or two later.

Description
The ship displaced . She had a single trunk steam engine that drove the propeller using steam provided by six boilers that exhausted through a single funnel. For long-distance travel, Arapiles was fitted with three masts and ship rigged.

The ship was armed with two Armstrong  and five  rifled muzzle-loading guns as well as ten 68-pounder smoothbore guns.

Construction and career

Arapiles, named for the hills at the Battle of Salamanca, was built by Green at their shipyard in Blackwall, London. The ship was launched on 17 October 1864 and completed the following year.

Arapiles ran aground in early 1873 off the Venezuelan coast and was sent to Brooklyn, New York for repairs that lasted from May to January 1874. During the Virginius Affair later that year, a lighter sank, blocking the drydock gates in which Arapiles was being repaired as tensions rose between the United States and Spain. The ship was hulked in 1879 and her reconstruction was cancelled when the poor condition of her hull was noted in 1882. She was broken up a year or two later.

Memorial

She is commemorated by a bas relief, on the side of the statue of Richard Green who died while she was still under construction in his shipyard. The statue stands outside the Poplar Baths in London.

Footnotes

References

External links

La Marina Blindada en el Siglo XIX

1864 ships
Ships built on the River Thames
Ironclad warships of the Spanish Navy
Maritime incidents in 1873